Saint-Paul-et-Valmalle (Languedocien: Sant Pau e Valmala) is a commune in the Hérault department in the Occitanie region in southern France.

Population

See also
Communes of the Hérault department

References

Communes of Hérault